Michael Anthony Viscardi (born February 22, 1989 in Plano, Texas) of San Diego, California is an American mathematician who, as a highschooler, won the 2005 Siemens Competition and Davidson Fellowship with a mathematical project on the Dirichlet problem, whose applications include describing the flow of heat across a metal surface, winning $100,000 and $50,000 in scholarships, respectively. Viscardi's theorem is an expansion of the 19th-century work of Peter Gustav Lejeune Dirichlet. He was also named a finalist with the same project in the Intel Science Talent Search. Viscardi placed Best of Category in Mathematics at the International Science and Engineering Fair (ISEF) in May 2006. Viscardi also qualified for the United States of America Mathematical Olympiad and the Junior Science and Humanities Symposium.

Life
Viscardi was homeschooled for high school, supplemented with mathematics classes at the University of California, San Diego. He is also a pianist and violinist, and onetime concertmaster
of the San Diego Youth Symphony.

Viscardi is a member of the Harvard College class of 2010. He graduated summa cum laude from Harvard, receiving a 2010 Thomas T. Hoopes, Class of 1919, Prize, and earning the 2011 Morgan Prize honorable mention for his senior thesis "Alternate Compactifications of the Moduli Space of Genus One Maps". He worked as a postdoc at UC Berkeley from 2016 to 2018.

Selected publication
.

References

External links
Viscardi's website at MIT
Michael Viscardi: Person of the Week
Michael's Presentation
Biography at Davidson Institute site

1989 births
Living people
People from Plano, Texas
21st-century American mathematicians
Harvard College alumni
American male violinists
People from San Diego
American male pianists
21st-century American pianists
21st-century American violinists
21st-century American male musicians